Waterhen is a northern community in the Canadian province of Manitoba. It is recognized as a designated place by Statistics Canada.

Geography 
Waterhen is on the Waterhen River at the intersection of Provincial Road 276 and Provincial Road 328. It covers a land area spanning from the northern shore of Lake Manitoba to the southern shore of Waterhen Lake.

Demographics 

Government 
Waterhen has a community council comprising a mayor and four councillors.

See also 
List of communities in Manitoba
List of designated places in Manitoba

References 

Designated places in Manitoba
Northern communities in Manitoba